Suvorove is a village located in Armiansk Municipality, Crimea. Population:

See also
Armiansk Municipality

References

Villages in Crimea
Armiansk Municipality